Blood on the Bricks may refer to:

Blood on the Bricks (Iron City Houserockers album), 1981
Blood on the Bricks (Aldo Nova album), 1991
"Blood on the Bricks" (song), a song from the album